Burning Angels (バーニングエンジェル) is a shoot 'em up video game developed and published by Naxat Soft for the PC Engine in 1990 only in Japan.

Gameplay
Gameplay consists of 7 stages, and the game allows for simultaneous co-op play. The game also allows for horizontal or vertical screen view.

Reception
Burning Angels received generally moderately positive reviews, including 82% from Génération 4, 69% from RAZE, and 58% from Power Play. Japanese gaming magazine Famitsu gave the game a score of 23 out of 40.

References

External links
 Burning Angels at MobyGames

1990 video games
Cooperative video games
Japan-exclusive video games
Multiplayer and single-player video games
Science fiction video games
TurboGrafx-16 games
TurboGrafx-16-only games
Vertically scrolling shooters
Video games developed in Japan
Video games featuring female protagonists
Video games set in the 21st century